State Route 4 (SR 4) is a  long state highway located in southern and western Maine.  It is a major interregional route and the first such route to be designated in the state. The southern terminus is at the New Hampshire border in South Berwick, where it connects to New Hampshire Route 4, and the northern terminus is at Haines Landing on Mooselookmeguntic Lake in Rangeley. Major cities and towns along the length of SR 4 include Sanford, Gorham, Windham, Auburn and Farmington.

Route description

South Berwick to Alfred 
SR 4 begins at the New Hampshire state line where NH 4 crosses into South Berwick. It has a brief concurrency with SR 236 in the downtown area before splitting off to the northeast. SR 4 runs in a northeasterly direction, running along the southeastern edge of Berwick and into the town of North Berwick, where it junctions with SR 9 and has a concurrency through downtown, then turns nearly due north. SR 4 passes through the city of Sanford, bypassing the downtown area to the east. It meets SR 4A (a former alignment of SR 4) and SR 109 at a traffic circle, with those routes providing downtown access. Continuing north into the town of Alfred, SR 4 junctions with U.S. Route 202 (US 202), SR 4A and SR 111.

Alfred to Auburn (concurrency with US 202) 
US 202 east joins SR 4 north and the two routes begin a lengthy concurrency. Entering Waterboro, US 202 and SR 4 meet SR 5, turning east to join SR 5 into Lyman before splitting off to the northeast. Continuing into Hollis, a separate segment of SR 4A begins as the highway crosses SR 35, and SR 117 joins US 202 and SR 4 to form another three-way concurrency. The road crosses the Saco River into Buxton, and SR 117 immediately splits off to the south. US 202 and SR 4 bypass downtown Buxton to the south, with access available via SR 112 and the east end of the SR 4A loop. The highway crosses SR 22 on the way out of town. Entering the town of Gorham, US 202 and SR 4 cross SR 112 again before entering the downtown area and junction with SR 25, a major interregional route connecting to Portland and points west. The three routes are cosigned along Main Street, crossing SR 114 in the center of town. Continuing northeast, US 202 and SR 4 split from SR 25, then cross SR 237 before crossing the Presumpscot River into Windham. In Windham, the highway passes through the town center before intersecting with US 302 at a traffic circle. Continuing northeast, US 202 and SR 4 are joined by SR 115 as they cross into the town of Gray. The highway meets SR 26A, a bypass of Gray Village, then interchanges with Interstate 95 (the Maine Turnpike) at exit 63. SR 26A is cosigned with US 202, SR 4 and SR 115 into the village center, forming a short four-route concurrency. In the village, the highway junctions with SR 26 and SR 100, both major interregional routes. SR 115 splits off here and SR 100 north joins US 202 and SR 4. Now paralleling I-95 to its east, the highway continues through New Gloucester, where it meets the northern end of SR 231, and then into the city of Auburn. US 202, SR 4 and SR 100 enter Auburn as Washington Street and meet the eastern end of SR 122 before interchanging with I-95 again at exit 75. Crossing the Little Androscoggin River and continuing towards downtown, the highway meets SR 11 and SR 121 at a rotary intersection. Continuing north onto Minot Avenue, SR 11 joins US 202, SR 4 and SR 100 for  into downtown Auburn. At Court Street, US 202 turns east along with SR 11 and SR 100 towards Lewiston, leaving SR 4 after a  concurrency.

Auburn to Farmington 
SR 4 continues north on Union Street and then Center Street and Turner Road, staying on the Auburn side of the Androscoggin River. SR 4 has an interchange with Mount Auburn Avenue, another connector to the Lewiston side, and continues due north into the town of Turner. SR 4 crosses the Nezinscot River and SR 117 again near the town's center. SR 4 crosses SR 219 in the northeast corner of town before continuing into Livermore, where it has a short concurrency with SR 108. SR 4 does cross the Androscoggin River into Livermore Falls, where it junctions with SR 17 in the downtown area. SR 4 and SR 17 are cosigned north into the town of Jay, where they run along the east bank of the river to an intersection with SR 140. In North Jay, SR 4 splits from SR 17 and continues north into Wilton, where it junctions with US 2. SR 4 turns east to join US 2 and the two routes bypass downtown Wilton, with access via SR 156. Continuing into the town of Farmington, US 2 and SR 4 gradually turn north towards downtown, intersecting with SR 133 south of town. In downtown Farmington, SR 43 joins from the west and the road crosses the Sandy River to junction with SR 27. US 2 turns south onto SR 27 while SR 4 and SR 43 join SR 27 north.

Farmington to Rangeley 

Continuing north out of downtown Farmington, SR 43 splits off to the east, with SR 4 and SR 27 maintaining a northward course along the Sandy River. A few miles to the north, SR 27 splits off to the northeast, while SR 4 turns northwest and junctions with SR 149 before crossing the Sandy River again. In the town of Strong, SR 4 and SR 149 straddle opposite sides of the river as it proceeds north, then turns west. Both routes junction with SR 145 near the center of town, and continue west through Avon and into Phillips. In Phillips, SR 149 crosses the river and terminates at SR 142. SR 142 has a concurrency with SR 4 before splitting off to the west. SR 4 continues northwest along the Sandy River, passing through a series of unincorporated townships and plantations without any major junctions. SR 4 runs along the east side of Rangeley Lake as it enters the town of Rangeley and junctions with SR 16. SR 4 turns west and joints SR 16, running along the north side of the lake into the town center, before SR 16 splits off to the north. Crossing the Rangeley River into downtown, SR 4 has its last major northbound junction at the western end of SR 17. The road continues west until it dead-ends at Haines Landing on Mooselookmeguntic Lake.

History

Background of interregional route experiment 
When the modern state highway system was first implemented in Maine in 1925, all state highways which did not cross state lines were assigned numbers 100 and up. This was to avoid conflicts with the New England road marking system, which had been adopted in the other New England states in 1922. All of the New England routes used one- or two-digit numbers that were retained across state lines. The New England route system was supplanted in 1926 by the U.S. Numbered Highway System, but the New England routes that did not become U.S. Routes were redesignated as state highways with the existing numbers. These numbering conventions were used regardless of a route's length, so interregional travel that did not involve the New England interstate routes or new U.S. Routes could involve using several different three-digit routes.

In 1931, the Maine State Highway Commission sought to rectify this problem by conducting an experiment in which it would designate a new low-numbered state highway which ran mostly on existing alignments of the original 1925 three-digit intrastate routes, replacing and/or overlapping the original numbers along those alignments. This would effectively create a long interregional route that could cover an important travel corridor with a single route number. SR 4 was the first interregional route to be designated as part of this experiment. The number 4 was chosen because the route was originally intended to be a northward extension of US 4 from Dover, New Hampshire, but the American Association of State Highway and Transportation Officials (AASHTO) never accepted the proposal and US 4 was ultimately routed south and east to its present terminus in Portsmouth. Despite this, the project ultimately proved to be a success and the new route was kept in place. The interregional routes were expanded in 1933-34 with a state-wide renumbering, including several other new route designations being introduced, and some of the original New England routes being given longer routings (the most significant of those being SR 11).

Original route of SR 4 and subsequent changes 
As first designated in 1931, SR 4 extended from its present terminus at the New Hampshire state line to the Coburn Gove-Woburn Border Crossing, running the entire length of western Maine. It was designated on a new routing between South Berwick and North Berwick. From North Berwick, it replaced former SR 214 which extended into downtown Sanford at SR 109, then was cosigned with SR 11 (which, at the time, still ran east to Biddeford) to Alfred at SR 4A (which, at the time, bypassed Sanford to the east). From there, it displaced former SR 111 which ran as far as the SR 25 junction in Gorham. A new routing was used from Gorham to Gray, then SR 4 was cosigned with existing SR 115 and SR 100 into Auburn. From Auburn, SR 4 replaced SR 107 which extended to Rangeley as SR 4 does today, except for the short extension to Haines Landing which SR 4 did not initially occupy. This short section of road became part of SR 16 in 1933, then was designated as a second iteration of SR 144 in 1936.  From the town center of Rangeley, SR 4 replaced former SR 144 (modern SR 16, not related to the "new" SR 144 in Rangeley) which ran northeast to Eustis, and a new routing along local roads (modern SR 27) to the Quebec border crossing. When SR 16 was designated in 1933-34, it was cosigned with SR 4 from Rangeley to Eustis, meeting the northern end of the newly designated SR 27 in Eustis.

In 1937-38, US 202 (designated in 1936) and SR 4 were moved from their original alignment in Hollis, Bar Mills, and Buxton onto a bypass alignment to the south. The original alignment became the northern segment of SR 4A.

In 1946-47, SR 4 was truncated to its junction with SR 16 on the east side of Rangeley, eliminating the overlap between the two routes. SR 27 was extended north from its original terminus in Eustis north to the Canadian border along the original alignment of SR 4. Around the same time, the designations of SR 4 and SR 4A in Sanford were swapped, with SR 4 assuming the eastern bypass route and SR 4A running west into downtown with SR 109, then north to Alfred along US 202.

In 1951, SR 4 was again cosigned with SR 16 along the north side of Rangeley Lake, then extended west to Haines Landing, replacing the second iteration of SR 144.

Junction list

Auxiliary routes
State Route 4A (abbreviated SR 4A) is the designation for two separate, but closely located, auxiliary routes of SR 4. Both are former alignments of SR 4 and loop to meet their parent highway at both ends. While not directly connected to one another, they are linked by a  stretch of US 202 and SR 4 between Hollis and Buxton.

Southern segment

This segment of SR 4A begins at an intersection with SR 4 and SR 109 south of downtown.  SR 4A and SR 109 run concurrently northwest into the center of town, where they intersect with US 202 and SR 11 at Lebanon and Winter Streets.  SR 109 continues straight to join SR 11, while SR 4A turns onto Winter Street to join US 202.  US 202 and SR 4A run concurrently to the northeast, crossing SR 224 (another bypass of downtown Sanford), then cross into Alfred where they intersect with SR 4 and SR 111.  SR 4A ends at this intersection, US 202 turns north to join SR 4 and SR 111 begins to the east.

This segment of SR 4A was part of the original 1931 alignment of SR 4 through Sanford. The northern segment was partially cosigned SR 11 until 1933, and then overlapped by US 202 when it was designated in 1936. The southern segment has always been cosigned with SR 109. An eastern bypass of Sanford was constructed in the late 1930s and finished by 1941, at which time it was given the SR 4A designation. The SR 4 and SR 4A designations were then swapped in 1946-47, with SR 4 assuming the newer bypass alignment and SR 4A assuming the older alignment through downtown Sanford. As a result, the entire length of this segment of SR 4A is overlapped by other routes.

Junction list

Northern segment

Like the southern segment, this segment is signed north-south, but is oriented nearly due west to east.

This segment begins at an intersection between US 202 / SR 4 and SR 35 in Hollis.  SR 4A and SR 35 share a brief concurrency before SR 4A splits off to the east, crossing SR 117 in the process.  The highway continues to the east into the town of Buxton.  SR 4A then crosses SR 112 before terminating at US 202/SR 4.

This segment of SR 4A is a former alignment of both US 202 and SR 4, which were moved to a southern bypass alignment in 1937-38.

Junction list
Mileposts on this section of SR 4A continue from the southern segment, omitting the connecting section of US 202/SR 4.

References

External links

Maine State Route log via floodgap.com: Maine State Route 4

004
Transportation in York County, Maine
Transportation in Androscoggin County, Maine
Transportation in Cumberland County, Maine
Transportation in Franklin County, Maine